Enrico Bruna (11 November 1880 – 7 February 1921) was an Italian rower.

Bruna was born in 1880 in Venice. He competed at the 1906 Intercalated Games (also known as the 1906 Olympic Games) in Athens where he won three rowing gold medals: in the coxed pair event over 1 km, in the same boat class over 1 mile, and in the coxed four.

After WWI, he competed in the men's coxed four at the Inter-Allied Games outside Paris and won gold. He died two years later in Venice aged 40.

References

1880 births
1921 deaths
Italian male rowers
Olympic rowers of Italy
Rowers at the 1906 Intercalated Games
Sportspeople from Venice
European Rowing Championships medalists